Tumble Mountain is in the Absaroka Range in the U.S. state of Montana. The peak is located in Custer National Forest. The tiny glacieret Tumble Glacier lies to the northeast.

References

Mountains of Stillwater County, Montana
Mountains of Montana